The Hebrew Institute of Riverdale is an Open Orthodox synagogue in the residential  Riverdale neighborhood of New York City. The congregation was founded in 1971 and was led by Rabbi Avi Weiss from 1973 to 2015. He has since assumed the role as Rabbi in Residence and Rabbi Steven Exler assumed the role of Senior Rabbi.

The congregation is known for its pioneering of women's participation in prayer and Torah study.

The synagogue introduced one Friday night "the first woman to lead this service in an established Orthodox synagogue in front of a mixed congregation."

History
The Hebrew Institute of Riverdale was founded in 1971 in a boiler room of the Whitehall Building off the Henry Hudson Parkway by thirty-five families, former members of the Hebrew Institute of University Heights in the Bronx who had moved to Riverdale. In 1973, Avi Weiss, who had finished his training at Yeshiva University a few years earlier, became the synagogue's rabbi. The congregation met at the Whitehall apartment building in the early years, before constructing a permanent building in 1980.

The Hebrew Institute became known for its activism in the campaign to free Soviet Jewry and in defense of Israel.

The congregation has grown to 850 families, and has served as a platform for Weiss's rabbinical advocacy.  The Jerusalem Post has called the Hebrew Institute "a training ground for young Modern Orthodox rabbis who go on to take over congregations of their own".

References

External links

Modern Orthodox synagogues in the United States
Open Orthodox Judaism
Orthodox synagogues in New York City
Jewish organizations established in 1971
Riverdale, Bronx
Synagogues in the Bronx